The Anatomical Record is a peer-reviewed scientific journal covering anatomy. It was established by the American Association of Anatomists in 1906 and is published by John Wiley & Sons. According to the Journal Citation Reports, the journal has a 2020 impact factor of 2.064.

See also

 List of biology journals

References

External links
 

Anatomy journals
Wiley (publisher) academic journals
Publications established in 1906
Monthly journals
English-language journals
1906 establishments in the United States